René Boylesve (14 April 1867 in La Haye-Descartes – 14 January 1926 in Paris), born René Marie Auguste Tardiveau, was a French writer and a literary critic.

Biography 
Boylesve was orphaned early and went to school in Poitiers and Tours. In 1895 he began to publish articles in various journals. He is considered the heir of Honoré de Balzac and precursor of Marcel Proust. In 1919 he was inducted into the Académie française.

Works 
 Le Médecin des Dames de Néans (1896),
 Le Parfum des Îles Borromées (1898)
 Mademoiselle Cloque (1899),
 La Becquée (1901),
 La Leçon d’amour dans un parc (1902), 
 L’Enfant à la balustrade (1903),
 Le Meilleur ami (1909),
 La Jeune Fille Bien élevée (1909),
 Madeleine jeune femme (1912),
 Élise (1921),
 Nouvelles leçons d’amour dans un parc (1924),
 Souvenirs du jardin détruit (1924),
 Je vous ai désirée un soir (1925).

 Bibliography 
 Dictionnaire des lettres françaises, sixth volume: Le xxe siècle. LGF-Le Livre de Poche, Paris 1998,  
 Jean Ménard: L'oeuvre de René Boylesve. Librairie Nizet, Paris 1956 
 Marc Piguet: René Boylesve, l’Homme à la balustrade. Éditions Pays et Terroirs, Cholet 2007 
 François Trémouilloux: René Boylesve, Romancier du sensible'', Presses Universitaires François Rabelais, Tours 2010

External links

 
 
 SUDOC (Association of French university libraries) : works by René Boylesve 
 Brief biography and list of works on the website of the Académie française 
 René Boylesve - un grand écrivan méconnu 
 La Touraine (1926) 
 Archives of René Boylesve (Fonds René Boylesve, R11713) are held at Library and Archives Canada It contains correspondence and three manuscripts. 

People from Indre-et-Loire
1867 births
1926 deaths
Deaths from cancer in France
Burials at Passy Cemetery
Members of the Académie Française
19th-century French writers
20th-century French non-fiction writers
20th-century French male writers